The following is a list of the MTV Europe Music Award winners and nominees for Best Indian Act.

Winners and nominees
Winners are listed first and highlighted in bold.

2010s

2020s

2021

2022

See also
 MTV Immies
 MTV Asia Award for Favorite Artist India
 MTV VMA International Viewer's Choice Award for MTV India

References

MTV Europe Music Awards
Indian music awards
Awards established in 2012